Matthew Joseph Willig (born January 21, 1969) is an American actor and former American football offensive tackle in the National Football League (NFL).

Early life and education
Willig was born in La Mirada, California. He played football and basketball at St. Paul High School (Santa Fe Springs, California). He played college football at the University of Southern California as a member of the 1989 Rose Bowl winning team. He was a public administration major.

Professional football career
Willig played 14 years for the New York Jets, Atlanta Falcons, Green Bay Packers, St. Louis Rams, San Francisco 49ers, and Carolina Panthers. Willig was on the winning St. Louis Rams team in Super Bowl XXXIV, and on the Carolina Panthers' team in Super Bowl XXXVIII.

Acting career
Willig portrayed Special Agent Simon Cade in season eight of NCIS until the first episode of season nine (airdate 20 September 2011). In 2009, he had a supporting role as a brutish caveman tormenting Jack Black and Michael Cera in the motion picture Year One. He appeared as a gang member named Little Chino on the Showtime series, Dexter (2007). He has appeared as a bodyguard named Yuri on the NBC series Chuck, and also has appeared in an episode of My Name is Earl entitled "Bullies". He also appeared in a season 7 episode of Malcolm In the Middle, as Crash, a recovering alcoholic, and had a small role in the 1993 Hong Kong action movie, Full Contact. He appeared in a minor role in iCarly as a truckdriver named "Sledghammer". He made another guest appearance on The Suite Life on Deck as a genie in season 2 episode 22. On Sonny with a Chance in the "Sonny Get Your Goat" episode, he appeared as "Limo", the mode of transportation to Tawni's motel room in a foreign country, and appeared in the Disney XD show Pair of Kings. Willig also had a supporting role in the second episode of Terriers. He played Mike Drake in the critically acclaimed independent thriller The Employer. He also appears in the 2013 film A Resurrection. In 2011, he was on the CBS soap opera The Young and the Restless, as Billy Abbott's bodyguard, "Tank". More recently he played One Eye, a Mexican drug dealer, in We're The Millers and Gregorek in NBC's series Grimm.

In 2014, he appeared in Season 1 of Brooklyn Nine-Nine as Brandon Jacoby (Season 1, episode 14 : "The Ebony Falcon").

In 2015, Willig had a recurring role as Lash in the third season of the science fiction television series Agents of S.H.I.E.L.D. He also played former NFL player Justin Strzelczyk in the film Concussion.

In 2019, Willig played a Black Satan gang member named Creep in Rob Zombie's film 3 from Hell.

Willig voiced Juggernaut in the Marvel game Spider-Man: Shattered Dimensions.

In February 2021, he appeared as André the Giant in the NBC comedy series Young Rock.

Willig has acted in numerous national commercial campaigns, including a Capital One spot with David Spade, a Bud Light spot, and as an action hero in a Halls commercial.

Personal life
Willig was raised Catholic. He supported the NOH8 Campaign in opposition to California Proposition 8, which made same-sex marriage illegal in the state of California. He criticized "the complete hypocrisy that goes on with the Church, and their stance on gays", and that he had "evolved into feeling that equality and treating everyone the same is the utmost important thing". Despite his disagreement with the Church's stance on same-sex marriage, he was still a practicing Catholic as of 2012.

Willig has two daughters.

Filmography

References

External links

1969 births
Living people
American male film actors
American male television actors
American male voice actors
American football offensive tackles
American people of German descent
American people of Lebanese descent
Atlanta Falcons players
Carolina Panthers players
Green Bay Packers players
New York Jets players
Sportspeople from Los Angeles County, California
San Francisco 49ers players
St. Louis Rams players
USC Trojans football players
Players of American football from California